The Dynamic Sport Enigma is a Polish single-place, paraglider that was designed by Wojtek Pierzyński and produced by Dynamic Sport of Kielce. It is now out of production.

Design and development
The Enigma was designed as an intermediate glider. The models are each named for their relative size.

Operational history
Reviewer Noel Bertrand described the Enigma in a 2003 review as priced very competitively.

Variants
Enigma M
Medium-sized model for mid-weight pilots.
Enigma L
Large-sized model for heavier pilots.
Enigma XL
Extra large-sized model for much heavier pilots.

Specifications (Enigma L)

References

Enigma
Paragliders